Malen may refer to:

People
 Beatriz Pichi Malen (born 1953), Argentine singer
 Donyell Malen (born 1999), Dutch professional footballer
 Jonathan Malen (born 1987), Canadian actor
 Lenore Malen, American artist

Places
 Malen Chiefdom, a chiefdom in Pujehun District, Sierra Leone